SOLIDAR is a European network of NGOs working to advance social justice in Europe and worldwide. SOLIDAR voices the concerns of its member organisations to the EU and international institutions across the policy sectors of social affairs, international cooperation, and lifelong learning.

SOLIDAR has 60 member organisations based in 27 countries (22 of which are EU countries), and is active in 90 countries worldwide. Member organisations are national NGOs in Europe, as well as some non-EU and EU-wide organisations, working in one or more relevant fields. The network is brought together by its shared values of solidarity, social equality, and participation.

SOLIDAR works in cooperation with its members, trade unions, political institutions, and civil society actors. SOLIDAR aims to influence policy at the EU and international levels, and link members together to learn from each other and help them carry out projects. The organisation is affiliated with the Progressive Alliance.

Solidar Suisse featured Habte Araya in a 2017 advertising flyer to promote integration. Araya went on to push a 78-year old woman, and an unrelated 40-year old mother and her 8-year old son in front of a train at Frankfurt Central Station in 2019.  The mother and child were run over by the train; the mother survived. Araya threatened a neighbor with a knife.

Member organizations 
As of 2015, there are 34 full member organisations in the SOLIDAR network:
Arbetarnas Bildningsförbund (ABF), Sweden
Association Européenne des Droits de l’Homme (AEDH), EU
Arbejdernes Oplysningsforbund (AOF DK), Denmark
Studieforbundet AOF (AOF NO), Norway
Alianza por la Solidaridad (APS), Spain
Associazione di Promozione Sociale (ARCI), Italy
Arbeiter-Samariter-Bund (ASB), Germany
Arbeiter-Samariter-Bund (ASBÖ), Austria
Auser, Italy 
Arbeiterwohlfahrt (AWO), Germany
Arbeiterwohlfahrt International (AWO INTL), Germany
Berufsförderungsinstitut Oberösterreich (BFI OÖ), Austria
Centres d’Entraînement aux Méthodes d’Education Active (CEMEA), France
International Cooperation Network (CGIL), Italy
Community Service Volunteers (CSV), United Kingdom 
Féderation Européenne de l’Education et la Culture (FEEC), France
Fagligt Internationalt Center (FIC), Denmark 
Fonds voor Ontwikkelingssamenwerking - Socialistische Solidariteit (FOS), Belgium
General Federation of Trade Unions (GFTU), UK
Humanitas, The Netherlands 
International Federation of Workers’ Education Associations (IFWEA), South Africa
Instituto Sindical de Cooperacion al Desarrollo (ISCOD), Spain 
Instituto Sindacale di Cooperazione allo Sviluppo (ISCOS), Italy 
International Solidarity Foundation (ISF), Finland 
La Liga Española de la Educación y la Cultura Popular (La Liga Española), Spain
La Ligue de l’Enseignement (La Ligue), France 
Movimiento por la Paz, el Desarme y la Libertad (MPDL), Spain 
Norwegian People's Aid (NPA), Norway
Olof Palme International Center (OPIC), Sweden 
Solidar Suisse, Switzerland
Solidarité Laïque, France
Työväen Sivistysliitto - Worker's Educational Association (TSL), Finland
Volkshilfe Österreich Bundesverband (VH), Austria
Workers’ Educational Association (WEA), UK

Affiliate member organisations 
As of 2015, there are 24 affiliate member organisations in the SOLIDAR network:
Asociaţia pentru Dezvoltarea Organizaţiei (Ado Sah Rom), Romania
Asociácia odborných pracovníkov sociálnych služieb (AOPSS), Slovakia
Assamblea de Cooperacion por la Paz (ACPP), Spain
Baltic Platform, comprising:
-Johannes Mihkelsoni Keskus (JMK), Estonia;
-Latvian Trade Union of Education and Science Employees (LIZDA), Latvia; 
-Lithuanian Labour Education Society (LLES), Lithuania
Czech Council on Foreign Relations - Rada Pro Mezinarodni Vztahy (CCFR), Czech Republic
Coordinamento delle Organizzazioni non governative per la Cooperazione Internazionale alla Sviluppo    (COCIS), Italy
DGB-Bildungswerk (DGB BW), Germany
Forum Solidarni Dla Postepu, Poland
Foundation for European Progressive Studies (FEPS), Belgium
Initiative for Development and Cooperation (IDC), Serbia
Institute for Social Integration (ISI), Bulgaria
Instituto de Soldadura e Qualidade (ISQ), Portugal
Institut für Sozialarbeit und Sozialpädagogik (ISS), Germany 
International Union of Tenants (IUT)
Narodna Dopomoha (People's Aid), Ukraine
Pour la Solidarité (PLS), Belgium
Samaritan International (SAMI)
Solidarité Socialiste (SolSoc), Belgium
Solidarité Syndicale (OGBL), Luxembourg
Solidarity Overseas Service (SOS), Malta 
Union Aid Abroad (APHEDA), Australia
Volkshilfe Hellas, Greece

References

External links 
 http://www.solidar.org

International organisations based in Belgium